A Tale of Two Worlds is a 1921 American silent drama film produced and distributed by Goldwyn Pictures and directed by Frank Lloyd. The film stars several well-known actors including Leatrice Joy, Wallace Beery, Edythe Chapman, and J. Frank Glendon. The film has been preserved at the Library of Congress.

Plot

Based upon a summary in a film publication, Ah Wing (Warren) saves a white child during the Boxer Rebellion and raises her as Chinese in America as Sui Sen (Joy). Ling Jo (Beery), a tong leader and slave trader, desires Sui Sen and enters a marriage contract with Ah Wing where he will search and give the Scepter of the Mings to Ah Wing in return for the girl. Ah Wing agrees because he does not believe that the scepter can be recovered, but when it is produced, he, while heartbroken, must keep his word. The wedding day is set and Ling Jo wants Sui Sen even after being told that she is white. Robert Newcomb (Glendon), a curio collector who has fallen in love with Sui Sen, and with the help of a young Chinese man called "The Worm" (Abbe), who also loves her, rescues her from the tong chief.

Cast
 Leatrice Joy as Sui Sen
 Wallace Beery as Ling Jo
 E.A. Warren as Ah Wing
 Jack Abbe as The Worm
 J. Frank Glendon as Robert Newcomb
 Edythe Chapman as Mrs. Newcomb, mother of Robert
 Togo Yamamoto as One Eye, the Highbinder
 Arthur Soames as Doctor Newcombe
 Dwight Crittendon as Mr. Carmichael
 Irene Rich as Mrs. Carmichael
 Etta Lee as Ah Fah
 Goro King as The Windlass Man
 Margaret McWade as The Attendant
 Ah Wing as Servant Spy
 Louie Cheung
 Chow Young

References

External links

 
 
 Film still at silenthollywood.com

1921 films
American silent feature films
Goldwyn Pictures films
Films directed by Frank Lloyd
Silent American drama films
1921 drama films
American black-and-white films
Tongs (organizations)
1920s American films